Coco Solo was a United States Navy submarine base and naval air station, active from 1918 to the 1960s.

History
The submarine base at Coco Solo was established May 6, 1918. The site corresponds with modern-day Cativá in Panama. It was on the Atlantic Ocean (northwest) side of the Panama Canal Zone, near Colón, Panama. Five C-class submarines were based there during 1914–1919.

United States Senator John McCain was born in 1936 at a small Navy hospital, at Coco Solo Naval Air Station.

The larger Coco Solo Hospital was constructed in the summer of 1941.  The area containing it was transferred from the civil part of the Panama Canal Zone to the naval part when Franklin Roosevelt signed Executive Order 8981 on December 17, 1941.  

On December 7, 1941, three V-class submarines (Barracuda, Bass and Bonita) were stationed at Coco Solo. During  World War II, Coco Solo also served as a Naval Air Facility, housing a squadron of United States Army Air Forces P-38 Lightning aircraft.

By the 1960s, no U.S. Navy vessels remained, only some support staff and housing. At the far end of Randolph Road was Fort Randolph, unused except for military training exercises, and where the Fort Randolph Riding Club was located as used by the Canal Zone Horsemen's Association.

Until the mid-1990s, the town site of Coco Solo was used by the civilian employees of the Panama Canal as a residential area. The nearby Galeta Island U.S. Navy communications facility continued in operation as well. After the turnover of the Panama Canal to Panamanians in 1999, US military activity ceased at both Coco Solo and Galeta Island.

Coco Solo is now the site of two container terminals: Colón Container Terminal and Manzanillo International Terminal, which is the busiest container port in Latin America.

Climate

See also
 List of former United States military installations in Panama
 Naval Base Panama Canal Zone

References

External links

 
 Photo of the US Naval Hospital Coco Solo
 "The Battle for Coco Solo Panama, 1989", Infantry Magazine
 "Tropical decay blights McCain's Panama birthplace", 2008 Reuters story

Panama Canal Zone Townships
Military installations of the United States in Panama
Colón, Panama
United States Navy submarine bases
Buildings and structures in Colón Province
Military installations established in 1918
Closed installations of the United States Navy